Emily Cecilia Drumm  (born 15 September 1974) is a New Zealand former cricketer who played as a right-handed batter and could bowl both right-arm medium and right-arm leg break. She appeared in 5 Test matches and 101 One Day Internationals for New Zealand between 1992 and 2006. She played domestic cricket for Auckland, Northern Districts and Kent.

Drumm captained New Zealand in 41 women's one-day internationals, winning 28 of them, losing 12 and with one no result. She captained New Zealand to their greatest ODI success - winning the 2000 Women's Cricket World Cup in 2000/2001.

Drumm's 815 runs at Bert Sutcliffe Oval, Lincoln is the second-highest amount of runs on a single ground in Women's ODI history.

Drumm holds the record for the highest individual score in Women's Test cricket history when batting at number 5 position or lower (161*).

In the 2006 New Year Honours, Drumm was appointed a Member of the New Zealand Order of Merit, for services to women's cricket. Following her playing career, Drumm worked for Canon and has also been a radio commentator.

International centuries

Test centuries

One Day International centuries

See also 
 List of centuries in women's One Day International cricket
 List of centuries in women's Test cricket

References

External links

1974 births
Living people
Cricketers from Auckland
Members of the New Zealand Order of Merit
New Zealand women cricket captains
New Zealand women cricketers
New Zealand women One Day International cricketers
New Zealand women Test cricketers
New Zealand women's One Day International captains
Auckland Hearts cricketers
Northern Districts women cricketers
Kent women cricketers
People educated at Avondale College
Women's One Day International cricket hat-trick takers